Guy Provost,  (May 19, 1925 – February 10, 2004) was a French Canadian actor.

In 2002, he was made an Officer of the Order of Canada for being a "giant of the performing arts, admired and respected for his sensitivity and discipline, [he] is also a model for the new generation of actors". In 2003, he was made a chevalier of the National Order of Quebec.

See also
 Compagnons de Saint-Laurent

References

External links
 

1925 births
2004 deaths
Knights of the National Order of Quebec
Officers of the Order of Canada
Canadian male television actors
Canadian male film actors
Male actors from Quebec
People from Gatineau